Port and Harbour of Ilulissat is an atlantic port located in the Disko Bay at Ilulissat, Greenland. Accessible most of the year, it is operated by Royal Arctic Line, Arctic Umiaq Line and Royal Greenland.

The inner port area is home to a marina for smaller vessels and ferry and larger vessels to the west side of the port area.

The harbour can be restricted during winter due to sea ice.

References

Ilulissat
Ilulissat